Kanu Malla, also known as Kau Malla & Kalu Malla was the sixth king of the Mallabhum. He ruled from 757 to 764 CE.

History
Kanu Malla Defeated the Kakatiya King of the Kakatiya State(Presently Patrasayar) and extended the boundary of Mallabhum.

References

Sources
 

Malla rulers
Kings of Mallabhum
8th-century Indian monarchs
Mallabhum